Confield is the sixth album by British electronic music duo Autechre, released 30 April 2001 by Warp Records.

Background and production
With Confield, Sean Booth and Rob Brown largely abandoned the warm ambient sounds of their earlier works such as Amber and Tri Repetae in favour of more chaotic and abstract sound palettes and methods of composition that they had been pursuing with LP5, EP7, and Peel Session 2. Confield saw the experimental use of computer programs, specifically Max/MSP, to form the basis of songs instead of stand-alone synthesizers. According to Booth, "Most of Confield came out of experiments with Max that weren't really applicable in a club environment."

Like EP7 before it and their 2003 release Draft 7.30, Booth and Brown make use of generative sequences on Confield. However, in an interview following the release of Draft 7.30, Booth explained that although the beats they create using generative sequences may seem completely random to some, he and Brown exercised tight control over the limits and rules of what the beats could do.

"[On Confield] you have something that some people would call random, but I would say is quantifiable," Booth said. "It seems that for a lot of people, if they hear something that doesn't sound regular, they assume it's random. If live musicians were playing it, they'd probably call it jazz or something. But the fact that it's coming out of a computer, as they perceive it, somehow seems to make it different. For me it's just messing around with a lot of analogue sequencers and drum machines. It's like saying, 'I want this to go from this beat to that beat over this amount of time, with this curve, which is shaped according to this equation.'"

Reception

Pitchfork gave the album an 8.8/10, claiming that, "For those willing to take these times in stride, Confield promises elegant production, accessibility in moderation, and one of the most enveloping, thought-provoking listening experiences to come forth from leftfield this year." However, AllMusic, giving the album only a 3/5, argued that Confield was "a record to respect, not enjoy," a viewpoint expressed by other review outlets. The Washington Posts Mark Jenkins said that the duo had progressed from "making music that sounds odd" to "craft[ing] its music to sound wrong", further commenting that the pair now sounded "ragged and fidgety" rather than "smooth and pulsing" as in the past.  He said many of the songs sounded as though the CD player was skipping, and said the album was more madness than method.  Fiona Shepherd of The Scotsman held a similar view, saying the album sounded like "a malfunctioning dishwasher or a CD jumping. Forever."

Despite the record's controversial nature, the album scores an average of 82/100 at Metacritic based on ten reviews, the highest average for any Autechre album on the site.

Covers
In 2009, chamber orchestra Alarm Will Sound recorded a version of "Cfern" on their album a/rhythmia.

Track listing

References

External links
 Confield at the official Warp discography (features audio clips).

2001 albums
Autechre albums
Warp (record label) albums
Experimental music albums